The 1915 Washington & Jefferson Red and Black football team represented Washington & Jefferson College as an independent during the 1915 college football season. Led by Bob Folwell in his fourth and final year as head coach, Washington & Jefferson compiled a record of 8–1–1.

Schedule

References

Washington and Jefferson
Washington & Jefferson Presidents football seasons
Washington and Jefferson Red and Black football